Vasas SC created a fencing section in 1947, which had one of the most successful teams in Hungary.

Achievements

Current squad

Technical and Managerial Staff
Fencing team officials according to the official website:

Athletes

Men's squad

Women's squad

Fencing Hall
Name: Kovács Pál Vívócsarnok
City: Budapest, Hungary
Address: H-1026 Budapest, II. district, Pasaréti út 11-13.

International success

Olympic medalists
The team's olympic medalists are shown below.

World Championships

European Championships

Notable former fencers

Sabre
 Rudolf Kárpáti
 László Rajcsányi
 Gábor Delneky
 Pál Kovács
 Miklós Meszéna
 Attila Kovács
 Tamás Kovács
 Péter Marót
 Ferenc Hammang
 Pál Gerevich
 Imre Gedővári
 Imre Bujdosó
 Domonkos Ferjancsik
 Zsolt Nemcsik
 Áron Szilágyi

Épée
 Zoltán Nemere

Foil
 Endre Tilli

See also
Hungarian Fencer of the Year

References

External links
Fencing section website 
Official Vasas SC website 

fencing
Vasas SC
Sports clubs established in 1947
1947 establishments in Hungary
Fencing clubs